The Ludus Dacicus or The Dacian Gladiatorial Training School was one of the four gladiator training schools (ludi) in Ancient Rome. It was founded by Domitian (81–96), completed by Trajan (98–117), and was used to train gladiators drawn from among the Dacian prisoners taken by both emperors in their Dacian Wars. It was located east of the Colosseum, on the slopes of the Caelian Hill.

History 
Dacian prisoners were taken many times by the Romans and very often they were forced to fight in the arenas. Dio Cassius mentions that around 31 BC, after the Battle of Actium, where the Dacian king Dicomes provided help to Mark Antony, Augustus took the Dacian prisoners and made them fight in the arena as gladiators, against Suebi captives, a spectacle that lasted many days with no interruption.

See also 
 Ludus Magnus
 Falx
 Dacian warfare

Notes

References

Ancient

Modern 

 Bouley, Elisabeth, "La gladiature et la venatio en Mésie Inférieure et en Dacie à partir du règne de Trajan", Dialogues d'histoire ancienne, 1994, Volume 20, Issue 20-1, pp. 31ff. (French)

External links 

 Ludus Dacicus at dracones.ro 
 Ludus Dacicus fragments of Forma Urbis Romae at Stanford Digital Forma Urbis Romae Project

Buildings and structures completed in the 1st century
Ancient Roman buildings and structures in Rome
Roman Dacia
Military history of Dacia